Montégut-Lauragais is a commune in the Haute-Garonne department in southwestern France.

Population

Notable people 

 Pierre Duèze, Lord of Montbrun, (1244-1326)
 Shaul Harel, (1937- ) Neuropediatrician in Tel-Aviv, past-president of the Child Neurology Society. He and his family were hosted by the inhabitants and the local Authority and they lived in the village presbytery during the World-War II exodus (May–October 1940). His name by then was Charlie Hilsberg. As he and his family went back to Brussels thereafter, he survived war with the help of the Comité de Défense des Juifs and notably to Andrée Geulen-Herscovici, an active resistant.

See also
Communes of the Haute-Garonne department

References

Communes of Haute-Garonne